Mega Manila is a megalopolis on the island of Luzon, Philippines. There are varying definitions of the megalopolis, but it is generally seen as encompassing the administrative regions of Central Luzon, Calabarzon, and Metro Manila. On some occasions, the administrative region of Mimaropa is also included.

It is frequently used in the press, advertising, television, and radio to refer to provinces bound to Manila, in contrast to the term Greater Manila Area, which is academically used to describe the urbanization process that has long spilled out of Metro Manila's borders, also known as the built-up area. Mapping out the built-up area around Manila requires finer granularity than the more generic term Mega Manila.

It is also being used more and more recently in planning for infrastructure projects by the government, particularly by the National Economic and Development Authority (NEDA) and Japan International Cooperation Agency (JICA).

Mega Manila is used in general reference to the relationship of Metro Manila to surrounding provinces. It references only provinces and not the exact settlement patterns of cities, towns, and barangays, which may be urban, suburban, mountains, or rural areas that are still part of provinces close enough to Manila to be lumped into the definition.

Definitions

Philippine Information Agency
Mega Manila, as a loose metropolitan area defined by the Philippine Information Agency (PIA), is divided into the National Capital Region (Metro Manila) and the suburbs of Central Luzon, Calabarzon, and Mimaropa.

Mega Manila's 2015 population was projected at 40,368,979 or 40% of the country's population, and covers roughly half of Luzon, with an area of 52,097.66 square kilometers, including many rural areas.

National Economic and Development Authority 
The National Economic and Development Authority (NEDA) defines Mega Manila as Metro Manila and the surrounding specific provinces of Bulacan, Rizal, Cavite, and Laguna, especially on its study "Roadmap for Transport Infrastructure Development for Metro Manila and its Surrounding Areas (Region III and Region IV-A)".

Notably, these collection of areas is also known as the Greater Manila Area. Meanwhile, the NEDA study, which is a collaboration with the Japan International Cooperation Agency (JICA), considers Metro Manila, Central Luzon, and Calabarzon as the Greater Capital Region (GCR).

TV rating companies
TV ratings agency AGB Nielsen Philippines and Kantar Media Philippines consider Metro Manila and the provinces of Bulacan, Cavite, Laguna and Rizal as "Mega Manila" for their TV ratings gathering (area highlighted in blue on the map), a much stricter definition than the PIA. Using census population in 2010 the area has a population of 25,066,000 or about 26.6% of the population in an area roughly the size of Los Angeles County and average density over 2000 people per square kilometer. As a comparison, only the cities of Tokyo, Jakarta, and Mexico City have reached 25 million people, Shanghai may have but there is not enough detail in suburban statistics on it.  Both Mega Manila definitions only include entire provinces, without finer detail.

This Nielsen defined area has a higher ownership of televisions per household anywhere in the country due to its relative economic prosperity as compared to other areas in the country. Radio ratings agency Radio Research Council (provided by KBP) also provide measurement of audience ratings.

The stricter Nielsen definition closer reflects the built-up area surrounding Manila than the PIA definition, Yet even the Nielsen definition of Mega Manila cannot be merely equated to the built-up area; the Nielsen definition includes significant undeveloped forested areas, while completely excluding contiguous developed settlements in such places like northern Batangas.   Thus the academic definition as used for urban studies for built-up area surrounding Manila requires yet another term (e.g. Greater Manila Area) to disambiguate from the already used terms Mega Manila and Metro Manila.

Statistics 
Mega Manila encompasses the county's three most populated administrative region – Calabarzon at number one, followed by Metro Manila, and Central Luzon at third. The total population of Metro Manila and all the 12 provinces, including their three independent cities, 47 component cities, and 238 municipalities, is 41,099,507 as of 2020. This means 38.6 percent of Philippine's total population all live inside Mega Manila.

Areas under Mega Manila

Metro Manila 

Officially called the National Capital Region, it consists the Philippines' capital city Manila, 15 other cities, and one municipality. It is the seat of government of the Philippines. The cities of Metro Manila are the following:

Greater Manila Area 

The continuous region surrounding the Metropolitan Manila area. The provinces and the cities inside Greater Manila Area are the following:

Greater Capital Region 
A concept used by urban planners to refer to a region consisting the three regions of Metro Manila, Central Luzon, and Calabarzon. It is used by JICA and NEDA as reference in their planning works. The provinces and cities in the Greater Capital Region are the following:

 Metro Manila
 City of Manila
 Quezon City
 Caloocan
 Las Piñas
 Makati
 Malabon
 Mandaluyong
 Marikina
 Muntinlupa
 Navotas
 Parañaque
 Pasay
 Pasig
 San Juan
 Taguig
 Valenzuela
 Pateros (Municipality)

Aurora
 With 8 municipalities
 Bataan
 Balanga
 And 11 municipalities
Bulacan
 Baliwag
 Malolos
 Meycauayan
 San Jose del Monte
 and 20 municipalities
 Nueva Ecija
 Cabanatuan
 Gapan
 Muñoz
 Palayan
 San Jose
 and 27 municipalities
 Pampanga
 Angeles City
 Mabalacat
 San Fernando
 and 19 municipalities
Tarlac
 Tarlac City
 and 17 municipalities
 Zambales
 Olongapo
 and 13 municipalities

 Batangas
 Batangas City
 Calaca
 Lipa
 Santo Tomas
 Tanauan
 and 29 municipalities
 Cavite
 Bacoor
 Cavite City
 Dasmariñas
 General Trias
 Imus
 Tagaytay
 Trece Martires
 and 16 municipalities
 Laguna
 Biñan
 Cabuyao
 Calamba
 San Pablo
 San Pedro
 Santa Rosa
 and 24 municipalities
Rizal
 Antipolo
 and 13 municipalities
 Quezon
 Lucena
 and 39 municipalities

See also 
 Urban Luzon
 Mega Manila
 Greater Manila Area
 Metro Manila

References

External links
 Philippine Information Agency

Mass media in the Philippines
Television in the Philippines
Luzon